Derrick Labrent Jones Jr. (born February 15, 1997) is an American professional basketball player for the Chicago Bulls of the National Basketball Association (NBA). He played college basketball for the UNLV Runnin' Rebels.

Jones signed with the Phoenix Suns in September 2016 after going undrafted in the 2016 NBA draft. He joined the Miami Heat in December 2017 and reached the NBA Finals with the team in 2020. In November 2020, he signed with the Portland Trail Blazers. Jones was traded to the Bulls in August 2021.

High school career
As a senior at Archbishop John Carroll High School in 2014–15, he was named the Southeastern Pennsylvania Player of the Year, the Delaware County Player of the Year, was the PIAA Triple-A Player of the Year, and was selected first-team All-Catholic League. Under coach Paul Romanczuk, Archbishop Carroll went 23–7 overall in 2014–15, including a 12–3 mark in conference play. In the semifinals of the state tournament, he recorded 30 points, 18 rebounds and five blocked shots. For the season, he averaged 19.2 points, 10.1 rebounds and 2.3 blocks per game. During his high school career, he scored 1,645 points, collected 1,029 rebounds and blocked 268 shots, finishing as the highest scorer in school history.

College career
Jones joined the UNLV Runnin' Rebels for his freshman season in the 2015–16 NCAA season. Prior to the start of the season, the NCAA Eligibility Center requested that the ACT investigate test scores recorded by Jones and several other minority student-athletes from a particular testing site in Baltimore, Maryland. Despite this, Jones was cleared by the NCAA prior to UNLV's first game against Cal Poly in November. Jones was the Runnin' Rebels' second-leading scorer in 2015–16. He averaged 11.5 points on 58.9 percent shooting and 4.5 rebounds in 30 games. Jones recorded four double-doubles during the season, including a career-high 26 points to go with 10 rebounds against Chaminade at the Maui Invitational Tournament.

On February 29, 2016, UNLV was notified by the ACT testing service that Jones' score had been cancelled. As a result, Jones was deemed ineligible to compete under NCAA rules and was forced to sit out the remaining three games of UNLV's season.

Professional career

Phoenix Suns (2016–2017) 
On April 7, 2016, Jones declared for the 2016 NBA draft, but left open the possibility of returning to UNLV or going to another college program by not hiring an agent. Later that month, Jones hired an agent and remained in the draft.

Jones ultimately went undrafted in the 2016 draft, and subsequently joined the Sacramento Kings for the 2016 NBA Summer League. However, due to a groin injury, he was unable to play for the Kings during the tournament.

On September 25, 2016, Jones signed with the Phoenix Suns for training camp. Jones secured an opening-night roster spot after impressing the Suns during training camp and preseason. He made his NBA debut in his home state against the Philadelphia 76ers on November 19, 2016, and recorded his first field goal in the NBA to finish with three points in three minutes against the San Antonio Spurs on December 15, 2016. Despite spending much of the 2016–17 season in the NBA Development League with the Northern Arizona Suns, Jones was selected to compete in the NBA Slam Dunk Contest. He went on to make it through to the final round of the Slam Dunk Contest, where he ultimately lost to Glenn Robinson III. On February 28, 2017, he scored eight points in a 130–112 loss to the Memphis Grizzlies. Two days later, he had another eight-point effort in a 123–103 win over the Charlotte Hornets. On March 11, 2017, in a 100–98 win over the Dallas Mavericks, Jones made his first start, logging two points, a season-high seven rebounds, and one assist. On March 28, 2017, he had his first double-digit scoring game of his career, scoring 13 points in a 95–91 loss to the Atlanta Hawks. On April 9, 2017, he scored a career-high 15 points in a 124–111 win over the Dallas Mavericks.

In July 2017, Jones joined the Suns for the 2017 NBA Summer League. In November 2017, he had multiple assignments to the Northern Arizona Suns of the NBA G League. On December 7, 2017, he was waived by the Suns. Jones appeared in 38 games with Phoenix over two seasons, averaging 4.7 points and 2.2 rebounds in 15.2 minutes.

Northern Arizona Suns (2017)
On December 12, 2017, Jones was acquired by the Northern Arizona Suns.

Miami Heat (2017–2020)
On December 31, 2017, Jones signed a two-way contract with the Miami Heat. On a two-way contract, Jones split his playing time between the Heat and their NBA G League affiliate, the Sioux Falls Skyforce. He made his first start for the Heat on January 9, 2018 in just his third game, recording eight points, five rebounds, one assist and two blocks in 28 minutes against the Toronto Raptors. On July 1, 2018, Jones signed a 2-year, $3.2 million standard contract with the Heat.

Jones won the Slam Dunk Contest over Aaron Gordon during the 2020 NBA All-Star Weekend. They both had perfect scores in their first two dunks in the second round, forcing an overtime round. After they both earned perfect scores on their initial dunks, Jones won by scoring a 48 after taking off just past the free throw line to complete a windmill dunk; Gordon received a 47 after dunking over  Tacko Fall. The Heat reached the 2020 NBA Finals, but lost in 6 games to the Los Angeles Lakers.

Portland Trail Blazers (2020–2021)
On November 22, 2020, Jones signed a 2-year, $19 million contract with the Portland Trail Blazers.

Chicago Bulls (2021–present)
On August 28, 2021, Jones was acquired, alongside a first and a second round pick, by the Chicago Bulls in a three-team sign-and-trade also involving the Cleveland Cavaliers. On January 12, 2022, during a 112–138 loss to the Brooklyn Nets, Jones suffered a right knee injury. The next day, the Bulls announced that he had a bone bruise and would miss at least 4-to-6 weeks, although the timetable was later upgraded to 2-to-4 weeks. On January 26, the Bulls announced that Jones had fractured his right index finger during a workout and would miss an additional 6-to-8 weeks. On the same day, however, he was upgraded to a timetable of 1-to-2 weeks in order to determine if he could play with a splint.

On July 6, 2022, Jones re-signed with the Bulls on a two-year, $6.6 million contract.

Career statistics

NBA

Regular season

|-
| style="text-align:left;"| 
| style="text-align:left;"| Phoenix
| 32 || 8 || 17.0 || .562 || .273 || .707 || 2.5 || .4 || .4 || .4 || 5.3
|-
| style="text-align:left;"| 
| style="text-align:left;"| Phoenix
| 6 || 0 || 5.5 || .500 || .000 || .833 || .7 || .5 || .2 || .7 || 1.5
|-
| style="text-align:left;"| 
| style="text-align:left;"| Miami
| 14 || 8 || 15.1 || .388 || .188 || .611 || 2.4 || .4 || .2 || .6 || 3.7
|-
| style="text-align:left;"| 
| style="text-align:left;"| Miami
| 60 || 14 || 19.2 || .494 || .308 || .607 || 4.0 || .6 || .8 || .7 || 7.0
|-
| style="text-align:left;"| 
| style="text-align:left;"| Miami
| 59 || 16 || 23.3 || .527 || .280 || .772 || 3.9 || 1.1 || 1.0 || .6 || 8.5
|-
| style="text-align:left;"| 
| style="text-align:left;"| Portland
| 58 || 43 || 22.7 || .484 || .316 || .648 || 3.5 || .8 || .6 || .9 || 6.8
|-
| style="text-align:left;"| 
| style="text-align:left;"| Chicago
| 51 || 8 || 17.6 || .538 || .328 || .800 || 3.3 || .6 || .5 || .6 || 5.6
|- class="sortbottom"
| style="text-align:center;" colspan="2"| Career
| 280 || 97 || 19.8 || .509 || .298 || .699 || 3.4 || .7 || .7 || .7 || 6.5

Playoffs

|-
| style="text-align:left;"| 2020
| style="text-align:left;"| Miami
| 15 || 0 || 6.5 || .471 || .444 || .400 || .8 || .5 || .4 || .3 || 1.5
|-
| style="text-align:left;"| 2021
| style="text-align:left;"| Portland
| 2 || 0 || 5.0 || .400 || .000 || — || .0 || .0 || .5 || .0 || 2.0
|-
| style="text-align:left;"| 2022
| style="text-align:left;"| Chicago
| 5 || 0 || 11.8 || .412 || .273 || .667 || 1.4 || .4 || .2 || .0 || 3.8 
|- class="sortbottom"
| style="text-align:center;" colspan="2"| Career
| 22 || 0 || 7.5 || .436 || .318 || .500 || .9 || .4 || .4 || .2 || 2.0

College

|-
| style="text-align:left;"| 2015–16
| style="text-align:left;"| UNLV
| 30 || 15 || 21.5 || .589 || .205 || .594 || 4.5 || .8 || .9 || 1.3 || 11.5

Personal life
Jones has one brother and two sisters.

On June 25, 2020, Jones tested positive for the coronavirus.

On January 17, 2023, Jones became engaged to his girlfriend Shakara during the Bulls' trip to Paris to play the Detroit Pistons.

References

External links

 UNLV Runnin' Rebels bio

1997 births
Living people
21st-century African-American sportspeople
African-American basketball players
American men's basketball players
Archbishop John Carroll High School alumni
Basketball players from Pennsylvania
Chicago Bulls players
Miami Heat players
Northern Arizona Suns players
Phoenix Suns players
Portland Trail Blazers players
Small forwards
Sportspeople from Chester, Pennsylvania
Undrafted National Basketball Association players
UNLV Runnin' Rebels basketball players